In enzymology, an ureidosuccinase is an enzyme that catalyzes the chemical reaction

N-carbamoyl-L-aspartate + H2O  L-aspartate + CO2 + NH3

Thus, the two substrates of this enzyme are N-carbamoyl-L-aspartate and H2O, whereas its 3 products are L-aspartate, CO2, and NH3.

This enzyme belongs to the family of hydrolases, those acting on carbon-nitrogen bonds other than peptide bonds, specifically in linear amides.  The systematic name of this enzyme class is N-carbamoyl-L-aspartate amidohydrolase. This enzyme participates in alanine and aspartate metabolism.

References 

 

EC 3.5.1
Enzymes of unknown structure